Spilosoma penultimum is a moth in the family Erebidae. It was described by Sergius G. Kiriakoff in 1965. It is found in the Democratic Republic of the Congo, Tanzania and Uganda.

References

Spilosoma penultimum at Markku Savela's Lepidoptera and Some Other Life Forms

Moths described in 1965
penultimum